Remo FC is a Nigerian football club. They play in the first-tier division in Nigerian football, the Nigerian Professional Football League. 1,000 capacity Gateway Stadium is their home ground.

Football clubs in Nigeria
Sports clubs in Nigeria